Amalia Pachelbel (29 October 1688 – 6 December 1723) was a German painter and engraver. She was born in Erfurt and was the oldest daughter of composer Johann Pachelbel. She was named after Amalia Oeheim, Johann's sister-in-law. According to Pachelbel's obituary retold in Mattheson's Grundlage einer Ehrenpforte of 1740, Amalia's interest in art pleased her father, and he was always supportive of her. Amalia became known for her floral watercolors, copper engravings and porcelain pieces. In 1715 she married notary J. G. Beer. She died in Nuremberg in 1723. In 1730, seven years after her death, she was included in Doppelmayr's encyclopedia of important mathematicians and artists of Nuremberg (Historische Nachricht von den Nürnbergischen Mathematicis und Künstlern), as was her father.

A commemorative plaque installed on a house in Erfurt where the Pachelbel family lived gives Amalia's name as "Amalie" and mentions her as the "author of the first knitting pattern (formula) textbook".

Notes

References 
 Welter, Kathryn Jane. 1998. Johann Pachelbel: Organist, Teacher, Composer. A Critical Reexamination of His Life, Works, and Historical Significance. Harvard University, Cambridge, Massachusetts (dissertation).

1688 births
1723 deaths
Artists from Nuremberg
German engravers
Artists from Erfurt
17th-century German painters
German women painters
18th-century German painters
Women engravers
17th-century engravers
18th-century engravers